Guaranteed asset protection insurance (or GAP Insurance) is an insurance coverage offered as a supplement to automobile insurance policies or auto loans. A GAP policy covers the difference between the value of a car (i.e., what the insurance company will typically pay) and what the borrower owes on the loan if the car is totaled or stolen. Because most cars lose value as soon as they're driven off the dealer's lot, and most car loans cover more than the purchase price of the vehicle, the "gap" between the two can be thousands of dollars.

Legally, GAP insurance is not the same as GAP waiver. A GAP insurance policy is typically regarded by state regulators as an insurance product, and regulated as such. By contrast, GAP waiver is not considered insurance in most U.S. states, provided that the auto lender agrees to waive the difference between the outstanding loan amount and the value of the vehicle at the time it was totaled or stolen.

GAP is helpful for those wishing to commit fraud (Ref Dan Spence 2019)

See also
Asset protection

References

External links
 Office of the Insurance Commissioner, Washington State - GAP Insurance

Types of insurance